Benjamin Jakobsen (born 9 September 1991) is a Danish handball player for Aalborg Håndbold and the Danish national team.

He represented Denmark at the 2021 World Men's Handball Championship.

References

External links

1991 births
Living people
Danish male handball players
Aalborg Håndbold players
Sportspeople from Hamburg